The Moccasin Mountains is an  mountain range located at the Arizona–Utah border in Mohave County, Arizona, and a small north section in Kane County, Utah.

The range comprises, at lower elevations, the Vermilion Cliffs, as part of its northeast, east, south, and southwest borders. Moccasin Canyon in the center-south, and Twomile Wash at the southeast lie in sections of the Vermilion Cliffs, and most of the entire mountains are part of the Kaibab Indian Reservation.

In Utah, the northeast of the mountains are bordered by Coral Pink Sand Dunes State Park.

Description
The southeast is defined by a canyon section, with the southeast-flowing Twomile Wash; origins of the wash, and its canyon reaches almost the mountain range centerpoint. The townsites of Moccasin and Kaibab are in this southeast section. Point Spring is located just northeast of the towns.

Two other springs are located in the range. At the southwest is Meeks Spring, at the origin of Potter Canyon, which trends southwest, then almost due-south. The central northeast of the range contains Willow Spring. Another spring is just east, Red Cliff Spring, at the base of the Vermilion Cliffs, and at the south terminus of the Moquith Mountains, (below Ed Lamb Point).

Peaks
There are no major peaks in the center of the mountain range.

Access
Arizona State Route 389 traverses the southwest, south, and southeast foothills of the Moccasin Mountains, along the Vermilion Cliffs. Kaibab, and Moccasin, Arizona are on a  route that trends north into the southern section of the mountains. Arizona 389 is accessed from Fredonia from the east, (adjacent to Kanab, Utah north, on U.S. Route 89), and from the west, Hildale-Colorado City; Cane Beds, AZ lies east of the two communities, at the Vermilion Cliffs, and the southwest region of the Moccasin Mountains.

The northwest, north, and northeast of the range in Utah can be accessed by Sand Dunes Road, and the region of Coral Pink Sand Dunes State Park. Sand Dune Road exits southerly from U.S. 89, just southeast of Mount Carmel Junction and Mount Carmel, and the Moccasin Mountains are about  distant.

References

External links
 Moccasin, Arizona at lat-long.com, (center-southwest of range) (coordinates)

Mountain ranges of Mohave County, Arizona
Mountain ranges of Kane County, Utah
Mountain ranges of Arizona
Mountain ranges of Utah